Events in the year 1896 in Belgium.

Incumbents
Monarch: Leopold II
Prime Minister: Jules de Burlet (until 25 February), Paul de Smet de Naeyer (from 25 February)

Events
 7 January – Official founding of the Belgian Automobile Club.
15 April – Law on the making and importation of alcohol replaces duty on the capacity of distillery equipment (adopted in 1833) with a duty on the proportional alcohol content of the distilled product.
 25 April – Murder of Delphina-Angelica Borée in Brussels.
 5 July – Belgian general election, 1896
 26 July – Provincial elections

Publications
 Pol de Mont, Dit zijn Vlaamsche wondersprookjes
 Maurice De Wulf, Études Historiques sur l'Esthétique de Saint Thomas d'Aquin
 Maurice Maeterlinck, Le Trésor des humbles
 Édouard van den Corput, Bruxellensia: Croquis artistiques et historiques
 Emile Vandervelde, L'Evolution industrielle et le collectivisme
 Émile Verhaeren, Les heures claires (Brussels, Edmond Deman)

Art and architecture
Paintings
 Fernand Khnopff, Caress of the Sphinx

Births
 11 February – René Joannes-Powell, athlete (died 1940)
 22 February – Paul van Ostaijen, poet (died 1928)
 10 April – Jean-Baptiste Piron, soldier (died 1974)
 14 August – Julien Lehouck, athlete (died 1944)
 10 October – Omer Corteyn, athlete (died 1979)

Deaths
 2 January – Walthère Frère-Orban (born 1812), politician
 9 January – Guillaume Vogels (born 1836), painter
 6 February – Julie Dorus-Gras (born 1805), soprano
 3 March – Constant de Deken (born 1852), missionary
 6 May – Constantin Héger (born 1809), educator
 7 June – Florent Crabeels (born 1829), painter
 11 August – Xavier de Cock (born 1818), painter
 9 December – Isidore de Stein d'Altenstein (born 1819), genealogist

References

 
1890s in Belgium